A Patriotic Offering is the first episode of the fourth series of the period drama Upstairs, Downstairs. It first aired on 14 September 1974 on ITV.

Cast
Regular cast
Angela Baddeley - Mrs Bridges
Gordon Jackson - Hudson
Meg Wynn Owen - Hazel Bellamy
David Langton - Richard Bellamy
Christopher Beeny - Edward
Jacqueline Tong - Daisy
Jenny Tomasin - Ruby

Guest cast
 Mrs. Hollins (Lala Lloyd)
 grandfather Monsieur Chargon (Cyril Cross)
 daughter Madame Chargon (Karen Glaser)
 daughter in law Madame Huguot (Elma Soiron) 
 granddaughter Celestine (Lisa Moss)
 grandson Jean-Paul (Ian Hoare)
 Lady Berkhamstead (Joyce Heron)

Plot
Monsieur Chargon comes to Eaton Place with his daughter (Madame Chargon) and his daughter in law (Madame Huguot). They are refugees of the War in Belgium and they tell the story of death and terror. Monsieur Chargon (Cyril Cross) is the father of Madame Chargon and the grandfather of the little boy Jean-Paul (Ian Hoare) and the little girl Celestine (Lisa Moss). His wife went missing and was never found. His son and grandson were killed in the fighting at the hands of the invading Germans and his little granddaughter died . Madame Chargon (Karen Glaser)  is the daughter of the old man Monsieur Chargon. Her husband was executed by the Germans. She came together with her little son Jean-Paul   (Ian Hoare) and her little daughter Celestine (Lisa Moss). Madame Huguot (Elma Soiron) is the wife of the old man's son. She lost her husband and son (only 16 years old) in the fighting and her little daughter in her arms was killed in bombing. Only the daughter's doll remained.

References

External links

Upstairs, Downstairs (series 4) episodes
1974 British television episodes